Pelion or Pelium was a town in ancient Thessaly. It is unlocated.

References

Populated places in ancient Thessaly
Former populated places in Greece
Lost ancient cities and towns